The red-brown pipistrelle (Hypsugo kitcheneri) is a species of vesper bat in the family Vespertilionidae. It is found in Indonesia and possibly Malaysia.

References

Hypsugo
Taxonomy articles created by Polbot
Mammals described in 1915
Taxa named by Oldfield Thomas